Oia is a genus of Asian dwarf spiders that was first described by J. Wunderlich in 1973.

Species
 it contains four species:
Oia breviprocessia Song & Li, 2010 – China
Oia imadatei (Oi, 1964) – Russia, China, Korea, Taiwan, Japan
Oia kathmandu Tanasevitch, 2019 – Nepal
Oia sororia Wunderlich, 1973 (type) – India, Nepal

See also
 List of Linyphiidae species (I–P)

References

Araneomorphae genera
Linyphiidae
Spiders of Asia
Spiders of Russia